RTL is a French commercial radio network owned by the RTL Group. Founded in 1933 as Radio Luxembourg, it broadcast from outside France until 1981 because only public stations had been allowed until then. It is a general-interest, news, talk and music station, broadcasting nationally ("category E" as classified by the CSA) in France, French-speaking Belgium, and Luxembourg. Until 2022, RTL was also broadcast on long wave frequency 234 KHz from Beidweiler which could be picked up in large parts of the continent. It has a sister station called Bel RTL tailored for the French Community of Belgium. As of 2018, RTL is France's most popular radio station with an average of 6.4 million daily listeners that year.

History

Radio Luxembourg

On 19 December 1929 the Grand Duchy of Luxembourg established a state monopoly on broadcasting, but the law provided for possible concessions to private companies who wanted to use radio bandwidth, with the state charging a fixed amount for private use of radio.

The Société Luxembourgeoise d'Études Radiophoniques (SLER) was founded on 11 May 1929 with the aim of obtaining an eventual broadcasting contract from the Luxembourg government. This company was run by Luxembourger François Anen, French publisher Henry Etienne, and French engineer Jean le Duc representing the Compagnie des Compteurs de Montrouge, which possessed 84% of the project's capital and had signed a secret agreement to work with the group CSF, the main stockholder in Radio Paris. Radio Paris wanted to set up a powerful peripheral radio station in Luxembourg, outside of the strict French regulations that only allowed public stations. An agreement between the SLER and the Luxembourg government signed on 29 September 1930 with a duration of 25 years ensured the Luxembourg government a fee of 30% on future profits of the station. The agreement also set up a committee for programming and a technical committee which allowed the government to regulate the private station.

The Compagnie Luxembourgeoise de Radiodiffusion (CLR) was founded on 30 May 1931, officially replacing the SLER.

On 14 January 1933 experimental broadcasts by Radio Luxembourg began at 1191 mètres (200 kW), an unauthorized wavelength, from the longwave transmitter at Junglinster. The official opening of broadcast was on 15 March 1933 at 19:00 with a pre-recorded concert of light music. Radio Luxembourg broadcast each evening from 19:00 to 23:00, in German, French and Dutch and was therefore the only French-language private broadcaster available in France and Belgium. Programmes in English débuted on 3 December 1933 under the editorial guidance of Stephen Williams.

The station closed down at the outbreak of World War II in 1939, but it resumed service after the War.

Beginning in 1946, it could be heard easily in France. Until the 1980s, only the French public radio networks could transmit from France itself. Radio Luxembourg was one of private "peripheral" networks transmitting from abroad.

Radio Luxembourg quickly gained a large audience in France. In the 1960s, it was faced with the success of another peripheral network from Germany, Europe 1, which adopted a modern tone and attracted a young audience.

RTL

Radio Luxembourg's changing environment led to the station being renamed "RTL" on 11 October 1966, less obviously mentioning its connection with Luxembourg (the acronym being short for Radio Télévision Luxembourg).

During the May 1968 crisis, the French public radio networks were on strike and TV was not independent from the government. RTL and Europe 1 were the main ways of obtaining independent information for the French people. They were nicknamed "barricades radio".

Unlike the British government's treatment of the Luxembourg English service, which was never allowed to have a landline from London, the French service has long had its main studios in Paris, with a landline from there to the transmitter. Consequently, it appears to the listener as simply a big French national radio station, as the Luxembourg connection is downplayed.

In 1981, under president François Mitterrand, privately run radio stations were allowed to broadcast in France. RTL, now broadcasting in France mostly at 104.3 MHz, was the radio network with the most listeners from 1981 to 2002.

Whereas Luxembourg's English service was always centred on light entertainment and popular music, RTL France is a mixed station. About 50% of its broadcast is information and talk focusing on news and current affairs with a large team of respected journalists.

Radio Luxembourg's two main national competitors are Europe 1 (another out-of-country commercial station, broadcasting from Saarland, again with Paris studios) and the state-owned France Inter. All three stations used to have very high-powered transmitters occupying long-wave frequencies that date back many decades.

The French service has called itself RTL for many years. It broadcasts through a network of FM transmitters throughout France, as well as the internet, cable and satellite. 

In 1991 a separate RTL Belgian service in French, called Bel-RTL, was established. Intended for the French-speaking part of Belgium with studios in Brussels, this station is licensed (along with many competing commercial stations) by the Belgian Government  with a network of FM transmitters covering Brussels and Wallonia.  It has no particular connection with the Grand Duchy of Luxembourg other than its ownership by the RTL parent company.

, RTL was the second-most listened to channel in France, behind France Inter, according to the Médiamétrie Étude Audience Radio survey. In the November–December 2021 survey period, RTL had about 6 million daily listeners.

In October 2022, RTL announced it would end its longwave broadcasts on January 1, 2023, in an effort to reduce the company's energy use.

RTL's long-wave broadcasts on 234 kHz were discontinued on January 2, 2023, at midnight UTC.

Programming
RTL features a popular daily talk show named Les Grosses Têtes, which has been broadcast since 1977. Other past or current programmes on RTL include:

 RTL Matin, the morning news session
 Ça peut vous arriver
 La Tête dans les étoiles, game with a star
 RTL Soir, the evening news
 Les Nocturnes, night-time broadcast on US music
 Stop ou Encore, a musical broadcast
 Le Journal Inattendu (the Unexpected News Bulletin), which consists of a news bulletin followed by a magazine conceived by a guest;  was created in 1967;  current anchor since 2011 is Marie Drucker
 Le Grand Jury, a political broadcast
 Malice, a cultural game
 Hit Parade, a musical chart
 La Valise RTL, a game

Station slogans 
 1977–1979: « RTL, c'est vous »
 1990–: « Les infos, c'est comme le café, c'est bon quand c'est chaud et quand c'est fort »
 1991–: « RTL, L'information en capitales »
 1990s–: « RTL, La vie en trois lettres »
 1996–: « RTL, Essentiel »
 2001–2005: « RTL, Vivre ensemble »
 2006–2007: « RTL, c'est vous »
 2007–2008: « Le plus RTL »
 2008–2009: « 100 % RTL » ; « RTL, c'est vous »
 2009–2011: « RTL, première radio de France »
 2011–: « Qui vous connait mieux que RTL ? »
 Since 2012: « RTL, toujours avec vous »
 Since 2014 : « RTL Première radio de France »

Administration
List of RTL/Radio Luxembourg presidents:
 1933–1953: Jacques Lacour-Gayet
 1965–1975: Jean Prouvost
 1975–1979: Christian Chavanon
 1979–2000: Jacques Rigaud
 2000–2005: Rémy Sautter
 2005–2009: Axel Duroux
 Since 2009: Christopher Baldelli

List of director-generals/heads of programming:
 1933–1934: Jehan Martin
 1934–: René-Louis Peulvey
 1966–1978: Jean Farran
 1978–1985: Raymond Castans
 1985–2000: Philippe Labro
 2000–: Stéphane Duhamel
 2001–2005: Robin Leproux
 2005–2006: Axel Duroux
 2006–2010: Frédéric Jouve
 2007–2008: Deputy head of programming: Jean-Marc Dorangeon
 2010–2012: Yves Bigot
 2012–2018: Jacques Expert
 Since 2017: Gauthier Hourcade
 Since 2017: Ghislain Thomas
List of directeurs de l'antenne:
 2005–2006: Jean-François Latour
 Since 2006: Jean-Yves Hautemulle

See also
RTL Group
Jacques Danois, RTL reporter

External links

References

Radio stations in France
Radio stations in Luxembourg
French-language radio stations
International broadcasters
Mass media companies of Luxembourg
RTL Group
1933 establishments in Luxembourg
Radio stations established in 1933
Longwave radio stations
News and talk radio stations